Ayalathe Adheham is a 1992 Indian Malayalam-language family comedy drama film directed by Rajasenan and written by Sasidharan Arattuvazhi. It stars Jayaram, Gautami, Siddique, Vaishnavi, Meena, and Thilakan. The music for songs was composed by Perumbavoor G. Raveendranath, while the lyrics were written by Mohan Sithara.

Plot

The story is about a college lecturer Premachandran (Jayaram), who faces troubles when his wife Sulochana (Gautami) develops an inferiority complex about their family life, after seeing their happily married neighbours Rajeevan and Radhika (Siddique and Vaishnavi). Rajeevan is a medical representative and working for a pharmaceutical company. Rajeevan's personality, confidence and his charisma impresses Sulochana and she wishes her husband was like Rajeevan. Sulochana keeps on comparing Rajeevan with her husband to such an extent that it makes Premachandran jealous.  Premachandran tries to mend his behaviour and tries his best to express his love for Sulochana but fails in his attempts.

The climax reveals Rajeevan to be a fraudster who has an extra marital relationship with one of their neighbours and everything adorable about his family life was a cover-up. Sulochana realizes her husband's sincere love towards her.

Cast

 Jayaram as Premachandran, college lecturer
 Gautami as Sulochana, Premachandran's wife
 Siddique as Rajeevan, medical representative
 Vaishnavi as Radhika, Rajeevan's wife
 Meena as Premachandran's mother  
 Thilakan as Sivan Pillai, Bank manager 
 Jagathy Sreekumar as Chandykunju, video shop owner and residence association secretary 
 Krishna Prasad as Sudheendran, Sulochana's brother
 Santhakumari as Rajeevan's mother 
 Babu Namboothiri as David Gomez, Premachandran's colleague
 Ramyasree as Malathi, Sivan Pillai's wife
 Maniyanpilla Raju as Achuthan Singh
 Indrans as Abu, assistant of Chandikunju 
 Alumoodan as Rajeevan's father
 Mamukkoya as Kuttappan 
 Mala Aravindan as Selvam
 Jose Pellissery as Joseph
 Kumarakom Reghunath as SI Feroz
 Vishnuprakash as Dr. Perera
 Thesni Khan

Box office
The film was commercial success.
It was well received by family audiences.

References

External links
 
 Ayalathe Adheham at the Malayalam Movie Database

1990s Malayalam-language films
Films scored by Perumbavoor G. Raveendranath
Indian comedy-drama films
Films directed by Rajasenan
1992 comedy-drama films
1992 films